Pandaha is a village in Rani Ki Sarai town of Azamgarh district in the state of Uttar Pradesh, India. It is the
birthplace of historian Mahapandit Rahul Sankrityayan.

Famous persons
Mahapandit Rahul Sankrityayan - Indian linguist, polymath, historian, and nationalist

References

Villages in Azamgarh district